"Is she not passing fair?" is a song written by the English composer Edward Elgar.

It was completed on 28 October 1886 but not published until 1908, by Boosey & Co.

It is described as a "Lay", written by Charles, Duke of Orléans (1391-1466) and translated [from the French] by Louisa Stuart Costello.

Lyrics

IS SHE NOT PASSING FAIR?

Is she not passing fair,
She whom I love so well ?
On earth, in sea, or air,
Where may her equal dwell ?
Oh! tell me, ye who dare
To brave her beauty's spell,
Is she not passing fair,
She whom I love so well ?

 
Whether she speak or sing,
Be jocund or serene,
Alike in ev'rything,
Is she not beauty's queen ?
Then let the world declare,
Let all who see her tell,
That she is passing fair,
She whom I love so well !

Recordings
Songs and Piano Music by Edward Elgar has "Is she not passing fair?"  performed by Mark Wilde (tenor), with David Owen Norris (piano).
The Songs of Edward Elgar SOMM CD 220 Neil Mackie (tenor) with Malcolm Martineau (piano), at Southlands College, London, April 1999

References

Kennedy, Michael, Portrait of Elgar (Oxford University Press, 1968) 
Young, Percy M., Elgar O.M., (London, Collins, 1955)

External links

Notes

Songs by Edward Elgar
1886 songs